The Government Post Graduate College Nowshera is a public college located in Nowshera Cantonment, Khyber Pakhtunkhwa, Pakistan. The college offers programs for intermediate level in Science, Arts and General Science group. The college also offers 4 years BS programs in various disciplines for which it is affiliated with Abdul Wali Khan University Mardan.

History 
Government Postgraduate College Nowshera started as inter college in 1956 and was upgraded to degree level in 1963. The college was upgraded to postgraduate level in February, 2004.

The college started 4 years BS program in Physics in 2011. In 2012, BS programs was extended to disciplines such as Computer Science, Mathematics, Chemistry and Economics. The college building is spread over an area of 35 Kanals with labs, classes, library, playgrounds and green lawns.

Departments And Faculties 
The college has mainly two faculties.

Social Sciences 
Social Sciences faculty has English, History, Islamiyat, Pakistan Studies, Urdu, Health and Physical Education, Economics and political science departments.

Physical and Biological Sciences 
Physical and Biological Sciences has Chemistry, Computer Science, Electronics, Mathematics, Physics, Statistics and Zoology departments.

See also 
 University of Technology, Nowshera
 Northern University, Nowshera
 Abdul Wali Khan University Mardan

References 

Public universities and colleges in Khyber Pakhtunkhwa
Universities and colleges in Nowshera District